Ypthima sesara, also known by its common name common Fijian ringlet is a species from the genus Ypthima. This butterfly was first described by William Chapman Hewitson in 1865.

References

Ypthima